Raphael Edereho (born March 21, 1983 in Delta State, Nigeria) is a retired Nigerian football player.

Club career
Edereho started his career at the Saudi Arabian club Al Sarha FC in 2000. The following year, he moved back to his homeland, Nigeria, and played for Ebiedafe FC, and then transferred in 2002 to another Nigerian club, AS Racine FC. In 2004, Edereho made his first move to Europe and was transferred to KF Prishtina playing in the Football Superleague of Kosovo. The Finnish Veikkausliiga League was his next destination where he played for RoPS Rovaniemi, Tervarit Oulu and KuPS Kuopio where he impressed enough to transfer to Iranian giants Persepolis FC in 2006. In November 2006, it was also found out that KuPS Kuopio did not receive the transfer fee for Edereho from Persepolis. FIFA was investigating the situation and decided that Persepolis must pay the transfer fee. In 2011, he moved to OPS. In 2012–13 he played with Najaf FC, in 2013–14 with Duhok SC, in 2014 with Naft Maysan, and in 2014–15 with Masafi Al-Shamal, all in the Iraqi Premier League.

International career
Edereho has represented Nigeria at U17 level.

References

External links
 KuPS Magazine Article (Finnish)
 Edereho to Persepolis FC (Finnish)

1983 births
Living people
Sportspeople from Delta State
Nigerian footballers
Nigerian expatriate footballers
Association football forwards
Rovaniemen Palloseura players
AC Oulu players
Kuopion Palloseura players
Veikkausliiga players
Expatriate footballers in Finland
Persian Gulf Pro League players
Persepolis F.C. players
Expatriate footballers in Iran
Kazakhstan Premier League players
FC Shakhter Karagandy players
Expatriate footballers in Kazakhstan
Football Superleague of Kosovo players
FC Prishtina players
Expatriate footballers in Kosovo
Nigerian expatriate sportspeople in Finland
Nigerian expatriate sportspeople in Iran
Expatriate footballers in Iraq
FC Santa Claus players